The Bluefield Micropolitan Statistical Area, as defined by the United States Census Bureau, is an area consisting of two counties – one in West Virginia and one in Virginia – anchored by the town of Bluefield, West Virginia.

As of the 2010 census, the μSA had a population of 107,342.

Counties
Mercer County, West Virginia
Tazewell County, Virginia

Communities
Places with more than 10,000 inhabitants
Bluefield, West Virginia (Principal city)
Places with 5,000 to 10,000 inhabitants
Bluefield, Virginia
Princeton, West Virginia
Places with 1,000 to 5,000 inhabitants
Athens, West Virginia
Cedar Bluff, Virginia
Claypool Hill, Virginia (Census-designated place)
Richlands, Virginia
Tazewell, Virginia
Places with less than 1,000 inhabitants
Bramwell, West Virginia
Matoaka, West Virginia
Montcalm, West Virginia (census-designated place)
Oakvale, West Virginia
Pocahontas, Virginia
Unincorporated places
Burke's Garden, Virginia

Demographics
As of the census of 2010, there were 107,342 people, 44,052 households, and 30,053 families residing within the μSA. The racial makeup of the μSA was 94.2% White, 5.5% African American, 0.6% Native American, 0.7% Asian, 0.0% Pacific Islander, 0.3% from other races, and 0.1% from two or more races. Hispanic or Latino of any race were 0.7% of the population.

In 2000 the median income for a household in the μSA was $31,841, and the median income for a family was $40,315. The per capita income for the μSA was $17,638.

See also
West Virginia census statistical areas
Virginia census statistical areas

References

 
Mercer County, West Virginia
Geography of Tazewell County, Virginia